The Legislature I of Italy was the 1st legislature of the Italian Republic, and lasted from 8 May 1948 until 24 June 1953. Its composition was the one resulting from the general election of 18 April 1948.

Main chronology
In the 1948 general election Christian Democracy (DC) went on to win a decisive victory with the support of the Catholic Church and obtained 48.5% of the vote, defeating the leftist social-communist alliance of the Popular Democratic Front (FDP). Despite his party's absolute majority in the Italian Parliament, Prime Minister Alcide De Gasperi continued to govern at the head of the centrist coalition, which was successively abandoned by the Italian Liberal Party (PLI) in 1950 and by the Socialist Party of Italian Workers (PSLI) in 1951.

Under De Gasperi, the first republican Parliament carried out major land reforms to help the poorer rural regions in the early postwar years, with farms appropriated from the large landowners and parcelled out to the peasants. In addition, the Parliament passed a number of laws safeguarding employees from exploitation, established a national health service, and initiated low-cost housing in Italy’s major cities. Here's a list of the main laws approved by the Parliament:

Law 28 February 1949, n. 43 – "Measures to increase workers' employment, facilitating the construction of houses for workers". The law, also known as Fanfani house program, was promoted by the Minister of Labour Amintore Fanfani and launched a seven-year plan for popular housing to increase the stock of economic housing by means of construction or purchase of economic accommodation. The law also established a special housing fund, the so-called "INA-Casa", within the National Institute for Insurance.
Law 10 August 1950, n. 646 – "Establishment of the Fund for extraordinary works of public interest in Southern Italy". The law established the Cassa per il Mezzogiorno (Fund for the South) to encourage the development of public works and infrastructure (roads, bridges, hydroelectric and irrigation) projects, and to provide credit subsidies and tax advantages to promote investments in the poor and mainly agricultural regions of Southern Italy.
Law 21 October 1950, n. 841 – "Rules for expropriation, reclamation, transformation and assignment of land to peasants", also known as the "Agrarian Reform". The law promoted the redistribution of lands to peasants in the poorer rural regions and the formation of agricultural cooperatives.
Law 24 February 1951, n. 84 – "Rules for the election of municipal councils". The reform changed the electoral law used for the election of the municipal councils, introducing a block voting system and abolishing the proportional representation.
Law 31 March 1953, n. 87 – "Amendments to the law for the election of the Chamber of Deputies", also known as Scam Law.

The end of the legislature was characterized by some controversial changes in the electoral law proposed by the government. Even if the general structure remained uncorrupted, the government introduced a superbonus of two thirds of seats in the Chamber of Deputies for the coalition which would obtain at-large the absolute majority of votes. The change was hugely opposed by the opposition parties as well as the smaller DC coalition partners, which had no realistic chances of success. The new law was called Scam Law by its detractors, including some dissidents of minor government parties who founded special opposition groups to deny the artificial landslide to the DC.

Presidential election
On 10 May 1948 the newly elected Parliament met to elect the first President of Italy. On 11 May 1948 liberal economist Luigi Einaudi was elected on the fourth ballot with 518 votes out of 900.

Government

De Gasperi V Cabinet

De Gasperi VI Cabinet

De Gasperi VII Cabinet

Parliamentary composition

Chamber of Deputies

 President: Giovanni Gronchi (DC), elected on 8 May 1948
 Vice Presidents: Giuseppe Fruschini (DC, until 10 July 1949), Gaetano Martino (PLI), Giuseppe Chiostergi (PRI), Ferdinando Targetti (PSI, until 21 January 1953)

Senate of the Republic

 Presidents: 
Ivanoe Bonomi (PSLI), elected on 8 May 1948 and resigned on 20 April 1951; 
Enrico De Nicola (PLI), elected on 28 April 1951 and resigned on 24 June 1952; 
Giuseppe Paratore (PLI), elected on 26 June 1952 and resigned on 23 March 1953; 
Meuccio Ruini (Ind), elected on 25 March 1953.
 Vice Presidents: Antonio Alberti (DC, until 16 March 1953), Salvatore Aldisio (DC, until 26 January 1950), Mauro Scoccimarro (PCI), Enrico Molé (US), Adone Zoli (DC, from 3 March 1950 to 25 July 1951), Giovanni Battista Bertone (DC, from 10 August 1951), Umberto Tupini (DC, from 17 March 1953)

Senators for Life

Gallery

References

Legislatures of Italy
1948 establishments in Italy
1953 disestablishments in Italy